Coinjock Colored School is a historic Rosenwald school building for African-American students located at Coinjock, Currituck County, North Carolina. It was built in 1920, and is a one-story frame, side-gable-roof, two-classroom school building with American Craftsman style design elements. The school was one of three Rosenwald schools built in Currituck County. It housed a school until 1950.

It was listed on the National Register of Historic Places in 2013.

References

African-American history of North Carolina
Rosenwald schools in North Carolina
School buildings on the National Register of Historic Places in North Carolina
School buildings completed in 1920
Buildings and structures in Currituck County, North Carolina
National Register of Historic Places in Currituck County, North Carolina
1920 establishments in North Carolina